Mohammad Sohrawordi Shuvo (born 21 November 1988) is a Bangladeshi international cricketer. He is a right-handed batsman and slow left-arm orthodox spin bowler. He played for Rajshahi Division from 2004/05 through the 2006/07 season and also appeared for Bangladesh Under-19s in 2005/06 and the Bangladesh Cricket Board Academy in 2006/07.

He has taken 5 wickets in a first-class innings on 5 occasions, with a best of 6 for 112 against Sylhet Division.  He also took 3 for 9 against the same team in a one-day game.

Shuvo was part of the 13-man Bangladesh squad that played in the 2010 Asian Games in late November. They played Afghanistan in the final and won by five wickets, securing the country's first gold medal at the Asian Games.

He was the leading wicket-taker for Brothers Union in the 2017–18 Dhaka Premier Division Cricket League, with 24 dismissals in 13 matches.

References

Bangladeshi cricketers
Bangladesh Test cricketers
Bangladesh One Day International cricketers
Bangladesh Twenty20 International cricketers
Rajshahi Division cricketers
Living people
Cricketers at the 2010 Asian Games
Asian Games gold medalists for Bangladesh
Cricketers at the 2011 Cricket World Cup
Asian Games medalists in cricket
Sylhet Strikers cricketers
Rangpur Division cricketers
1988 births
Abahani Limited cricketers
Victoria Sporting Club cricketers
Brothers Union cricketers
Fortune Barishal cricketers
Bangladesh North Zone cricketers
Medalists at the 2010 Asian Games
People from Rajshahi District